Daniel Allerstorfer (born 4 December 1992) is an Austrian judoka. He competed at the 2016 Summer Olympics in the men's +100 kg event, in which he was eliminated in the first round by Renat Saidov.

In the spring of 2018, Allerstorfer had a double herniated disc.

References

External links
 
 
 UJZ Mühlviertel

1992 births
Living people
Austrian male judoka
Olympic judoka of Austria
Judoka at the 2016 Summer Olympics
People from Rohrbach District
Judoka at the 2015 European Games
Judoka at the 2019 European Games
European Games medalists in judo
European Games bronze medalists for Austria
Sportspeople from Upper Austria
21st-century Austrian people